Opinion polls in the 2011 Polish parliamentary election were first recorded on 16 May 2010 and culminated before election day on 9 October.

Opinion polls

2011

2010

2009

2008

2007

References

Poland
2011